The 1993 North Atlantic Conference baseball tournament was held over two weekends, with the final round being played at Delaware Diamond in Newark, Delaware. All eight of the league's teams qualified for the tournament, the format of which was best-of-three quarterfinals and a four-team double-elimination final round. In the championship game, first-seeded Maine defeated fifth-seeded Drexel, 11-1, to win its first tournament championship. As a result, Maine received the North Atlantic's automatic bid to the 1993 NCAA tournament.

Standings 
The teams were seeded based on conference winning percentage only. They were then matched up for an opening round of four best-of-three series.

Division standings

Conference standings

Results

All-Tournament Team 
The following players were named to the All-Tournament Team.

Most Outstanding Player 
Maine first baseman Gabe Duross was named Most Outstanding Player.

Notes

References 

America East Conference Baseball Tournament
1993 North Atlantic Conference baseball season
1993 in sports in Delaware
College baseball tournaments in Delaware
Newark, Delaware